Gary D. White is a former American football coach.  He served as the head football coach at Sterling College in Sterling, Kansas for four seasons, from 1984 to 1987, compiling a record 25–14.

Head coaching record

References

Year of birth missing
Possibly living people
Sterling Warriors football coaches